HOCKET is an American contemporary music piano duo that is based in Los Angeles, California. It consists of Sarah Gibson and Thomas Kotcheff. Established in 2014, HOCKET is currently a Piano Spheres core artist.

In 2020, HOCKET was awarded Best Chamber Ensemble and Best New-Music Ensemble in Los Angeles by San Francisco Classical Voice's Audience Choice Awards.

References

External links
 

Contemporary classical music ensembles
Musical groups established in 2014
Classical piano duos
Male–female musical duos
American musical duos
2014 establishments in California